Karl Schumm Burger (26 December 1883 in Stuttgart – 3 October 1959 in Freudenstadt) was a German amateur footballer who played as a midfielder and coach, competing as a player in the 1912 Summer Olympics.

International career 
He was a member of the German Olympic squad and played one match in the consolation round of the football tournament in Stockholm. He scored one goal in the 16–0 victory against Russia. Overall Burger won eleven caps for the Germany national football team.

References

External links
 
 
 

1883 births
1959 deaths
Stuttgarter Kickers managers
Footballers from Stuttgart
German football managers
German footballers
Germany international footballers
Olympic footballers of Germany
Footballers at the 1912 Summer Olympics
SpVgg Greuther Fürth managers
Dresdner SC players
German footballers needing infoboxes
Association football midfielders